Hans Adolph Weymar (1 February 1884 – 4 July 1959) was a German international footballer.

References

External links
 
 

1884 births
1959 deaths
People from Schleswig-Flensburg
Footballers from Schleswig-Holstein
German footballers
Association football midfielders
Germany international footballers
SC Victoria Hamburg players